Kuwakot may refer to:

Kuwakot, Gandaki, Nepal
Kuwakot, Mahakali, Nepal